Alexandre Jose Bortolato (born November 10, 1973) is a former Brazilian football player.

Club statistics

References

External links

J. League

1973 births
Living people
Brazilian footballers
Brazilian expatriate footballers
J2 League players
Montedio Yamagata players
Expatriate footballers in Japan
Association football forwards